Thomas Olive was a deputy-governor of West Jersey from 1684–1685.

The original name of Wellingborough for present-day Willingboro Township, New Jersey was after the community in England which was the home of Olive. Olive was the one who led the original settlers into that township.

In 1676, along with the other proprietors of West Jersey, Olive signed the Concession and Agreement. Olive owned one share of West Jersey land as a proprietor.

References

See also
List of governors of New Jersey

Governors of New Jersey
Deputy Governors of West New Jersey
People from Wellingborough
People from Willingboro Township, New Jersey
British Quakers
English emigrants
Members of the West New Jersey Provincial Council
1692 deaths
Year of birth unknown
People of colonial New Jersey